Damascus is a rural community in Kings County, New Brunswick, Canada. This is the hometown of Alex Fudge. Former assistant ISA onboard HMCS Fredericton, a 2B mission that served as command ship for SMNG1 ROTO 15. He saved the ship from a fire and currently holds a CJOC coin.

History

Notable people

See also
List of communities in New Brunswick

References

Communities in Queens County, New Brunswick